Mohd Ivan Bin Mohd Yusoff (born on 13 May 1982) is a former Malaysian international footballer. He played as a midfielder for the Malaysia national team, Kuala Lumpur, Perlis, Sabah and Shahzan Muda.

Club career
Born in Kuala Lumpur, Malaysia, Ivan started his career with his hometown side Kuala Lumpur in 2003. In 2005, Ivan left Kuala Lumpur for Perlis side and helped his team to win their first Malaysia Super League title in 2005. He returned to Kuala Lumpur in 2006 and played for two seasons, before switching to PKNS FC in 2009. 

He played with Malaysia FAM Cup outfit Shahzan Muda FC for the 2011 season.

International career
Ivan made his international debut during a 2006 FIFA World Cup qualification (AFC) match against Hong Kong on 13 October 2008. He also represented Malaysia in the 2004 Tiger Cup mostly appearing as a substitute.

His first international goals came in the match against Cambodia as Malaysia thrashed Cambodia 6–0. He was also included in the squad for the 2007 AFC Asian Cup and played only one match, against Uzbekistan.

References

External links
 

1982 births
Living people
Malaysian footballers
Malaysia international footballers
PKNS F.C. players
Perlis FA players
Kuala Lumpur City F.C. players
Shahzan Muda FC players
2007 AFC Asian Cup players
Sportspeople from Kuala Lumpur
Malaysia Super League players
Association football midfielders